Nuwara Eliya District is a district in Central Province, Sri Lanka, centered on the tourist city of Nuwara Eliya.

Demographics

 

The population according to 2001 census is 703,610 of which 50.61% Tamils of Indian origin, 40.2% are Sinhalese, 6.5% native Sri Lankan Tamils and 2.4% Sri Lankan Moors. In terms of religion,51.0% of the population are Hindu, 39.7.0 % Buddhists, 5% Roman Catholics, 2.7% Muslims and 1.5% belong to non-catholic Christian denominations.

Geography

Nuwara Eliya district is located in the hill country of Central Province. The terrain is generally mountainous, with deep valleys.

Cities 

 Nuwara Eliya (Municipal Council)

Towns 

 Agrapatana
 Ambewela
 Bogawantalawa
 Bopattalawa
 Dayagama Bazaar
 Ginigathena
 Hapugastalawa
 Haggala
 Hanguranketha
 Hatton-Dikoya UC
 Kotagala
 Kotmale
 Labukele
 Laxapana
 Lindula-Talawakele UC
 Maskeliya
 Nildandahinna
 Nuwara Eliya
 Nanu Oya
 Norton Bridge
 Padiyapelella
 Ramboda
 Ragala
 Rikillagaskada
 Rozella
 Udapussallawa
 Walapane
 Watawala
 Norton
 Koththallena
 Pundaluoya
 Kandapola
 Pattipola

Schools
Poramadulla Central College is located in the Rikillagaskada community in Hanguranketha.

Diyathilaka Central College is located in the Hanguranketha community in Hanguranketha.

References

External links 

 Nuwara Eliya official web portal
 Explore Nuwara Eliya

 
Districts of Sri Lanka
Kingdom of Kandy
Geography of Nuwara Eliya District